Arbat (also Romanized as Arbaţ; also known as Arband) is a village in Qanibeyglu Rural District, Zanjanrud District, Zanjan County, Zanjan Province, Iran. At the 2006 census, its population was 144, in 33 families.

References 

Populated places in Zanjan County